Francesca Chillemi  (born 25 July 1985) is an Italian actress, model, television personality and beauty pageant titleholder.

Early life and career
At the age of 18, Francesca Chillemi won the Miss Italia 2003 beauty contest. She subsequently started a career as model, actress and television presenter.

She plays Azzurra Leonardi in the RAI TV drama Che Dio ci aiuti.

Personal life
Francesca Chillemi was photographed in company of Mutassim Gaddafi in 2009. She later admitted that it was only a friendship.

She is in a relationship with Stefano Rosso, shareholder of the OTB Group. They had a daughter together in 2016, and moved to New York the following year.

Filmography

TV shows
Un medico in famiglia
Carabinieri
Che Dio ci aiuti
Braccialetti rossi

Films
Cado dalle nuvole
Natale da chef
L'isola di Pietro (2019)

References

External links 

1985 births
Living people
People from Barcellona Pozzo di Gotto
Italian beauty pageant winners
Italian television presenters
Italian film actresses
Italian television actresses
Italian female models
Italian women television presenters
Models from Sicily
Mass media people from Sicily
Actors from the Province of Messina